MTS Turkmenistan was a mobile phone operator in Turkmenistan.
It was fully owned by Russia's MTS (network provider).
As of 2013, it had 1.89 million subscribers. Its rival  Altyn Asyr had 3.5 million subscribers. It was officially closed sometime in late 2017, leaving Altyn Asyr the only major mobile network operator in the country.

Company background 
On July 25, 2012, the company  signed an agreement with the TurkmenTelecom enterprise of Ministry of Communications of Turkmenistan which says that MTS Turkmenistan will on a monthly basis pay to TurkmenTelecom 30% of its net profit derived from operations in Turkmenistan. This agreement was for five years and may be extended another five years subject to some conditions. The company had also been granted GSM and 3G licenses for a three-year term.

Number of Subscribers

References

External links
 Official website

Telecommunications companies established in 1994
Mobile phone companies of Turkmenistan
1994 establishments in Turkmenistan